Knema communis is a species of plant in the family Myristicaceae. It is a tree found in Peninsular Malaysia and Singapore. It is threatened by habitat loss.

References

communis
Trees of Malaya
Vulnerable plants
Taxonomy articles created by Polbot
Taxa named by James Sinclair (botanist)